Splendrillia daviesi is a species of sea snail, a marine gastropod mollusk in the family Drilliidae.

Description
The length of the shell attains 22.1 mm, its diameter 7.1 mm.

Distribution
This marine species occurs off the continental slope of South Transkei, South Africa

References

  Tucker, J.K. 2004 Catalog of recent and fossil turrids (Mollusca: Gastropoda). Zootaxa 682:1–1295.

Endemic fauna of South Africa
daviesi
Gastropods described in 1988